Arsenura sylla is a moth of the family Saturniidae first described by Pieter Cramer in 1779. It is found from Venezuela south to Mato Grosso, Brazil and then west to Bolivia.

It is a large species. Males have a semblance of a tail and the female has an almost rounded rear wing.

One of its close relatives is the Arsenura armida moth, which is also found in Venezuela.

Subspecies
Arsenura sylla sylla
Arsenura sylla niepelti (western Colombia, Costa Rica, Ecuador)

External links
 Distributional Notes of Arsenurinae Including the First Record of Arsenura sylla niepelti in Ecuador

Arsenurinae
Moths of South America